St Edmundsbury Borough Council in Suffolk, England, was elected every four years. After the last boundary changes in 2003, 45 councillors were elected from 31 wards. The council was abolished in 2019, with the area becoming part of West Suffolk.

Political control
From the first election to the council in 1973 until its abolition in 2019, political control of the council was held by the following parties:

Leadership
The leaders of the council from 1995 until 2019 were:

John Griffiths subsequently became the first leader of West Suffolk District Council.

Council elections
1973 St Edmundsbury Borough Council election
1976 St Edmundsbury Borough Council election
1979 St Edmundsbury Borough Council election (New ward boundaries)
1983 St Edmundsbury Borough Council election
1987 St Edmundsbury Borough Council election
1991 St Edmundsbury Borough Council election (Borough boundary changes took place but the number of seats remained the same)
1995 St Edmundsbury Borough Council election
1999 St Edmundsbury Borough Council election
2003 St Edmundsbury Borough Council election (New ward boundaries)
2007 St Edmundsbury Borough Council election
2011 St Edmundsbury Borough Council election
2015 St Edmundsbury Borough Council election

By-election results

1995-1999

1999-2003

2003-2007

2007-2011

2011-2015

This by-election was held following the death of the Conservative Cllr Leslie Ager.

References

By-election results

External links
St Edmundsbury Council

 
Council elections in Suffolk
Borough of St Edmundsbury
District council elections in England